Edmund Becker (born 18 July 1956) is a German former professional footballer who works as manager of the Karlsruher SC youth centre.

Career 
Becker was born in Reichenbach.

His biggest success was as a player with Karlsruher SC, when he finished in tenth place in the Bundesliga. During his time with KSC, he played as a midfielder and a defender, playing 94 times between 1980 and 1985, scoring nine goals.

Coaching career 
Becker was given the training duties of Karlsruher SC on 13 January 2005. He is generally a quiet, receptive coach who spends much of his time listening to the views of his fans. Becker was fired on 19 August 2009.

References

External links
 

1956 births
Living people
Association football midfielders
German footballers
Karlsruher SC players
Bundesliga players
2. Bundesliga players
German football managers
Karlsruher SC managers
Bundesliga managers
2. Bundesliga managers